V1291 Aquilae is a single star in the equatorial constellation of Aquila. It has a yellow-white hue and is dimly visible to the naked eye with an apparent visual magnitude that fluctuates around 5.65. Based on parallax measurements, it is located at a distance of approximately 278 light years from the Sun. The star it is drifting closer with a radial velocity of −22 km/s.

This is a magnetic chemically peculiar star, or Ap star, with a stellar classification of F0VpSrCrEu, matching an F-type main-sequence star with abundance anomalies of strontium, chromium, and europium in the spectrum. It is a variable star of type Alpha2 Canum Venaticorum that ranges in visual magnitude from 5.61 down to 5.67 with a period of 223.826 days. This is most likely the mean rotational period of the star. V1291 Aquilae was one of the first Ap stars discovered with a period of more than 100 days.

References

External links
 HR 7575
 Image V1291 Aquilae

F-type main-sequence stars
Ap stars
Alpha2 Canum Venaticorum variables

Aquila (constellation)
Durchmusterung objects
188041
097871
7575
Aquilae, V1291